Allenwood (also called Union Town) is a census-designated place in Gregg Township, Union County, Pennsylvania, United States.  As of the 2010 census, its population was 321. Federal Correctional Complex, Allenwood is located here.

Demographics

References

Census-designated places in Union County, Pennsylvania
Census-designated places in Pennsylvania